Matthias Rolland (born 2 July 1979) is a French rugby union player. His position is Lock and he currently plays for Castres Olympique in the Top 14. He began his career with Colomiers, moving to Montauban in 2006 and helping them gain promotion to the Top 14 before moving to Castres Olympique in 2009.

References

1979 births
Living people
French rugby union players
Sportspeople from Dijon
Castres Olympique players
Rugby union locks